Industria Cartaria Pieretti (icP) is an Italian company which produces cardboard for industrial use, made starting from waste paper. Its headquarters are in Marlia, inside the Lucca paper district.

History 

In 1924 Giuseppe Pieretti founds in Marlia the F.lli Pieretti company (Pieretti Brothers), which starts producing straw paper. From 1935 to 1938 the company activities are expanded; they come to include the management of some more paper mills all around Italy. During the 1950s, Giuseppe's sons (Adriano, Graziano and Luisiano) take over the control of the whole company.

With the second generation in control, icP's core business shifts to packaging paper, completely made of waste paper. The 1970s mark the beginning of the corrugated cardboard production (1978). Two years later, the activities focus on stripe-cut board, so that it can be used in the production of tissue rolls cores or industrial tubes.

Products 

Every year approximately 120,000 tons of board are produced, with a gross income of more than 40 million euros. 60% of icP's total production is sold in Italy; the left part is exported throughout the world.

icP produces four kinds of paperboard: 50% of the production is used in the tissue cores market; 30% in the corrugated paperboard market; the remaining 20% is used for industrial tubes. The weight stays between 140 and 420 g/m2.

Organization 
Graziano Pieretti, Chairman, CEO
Luisiano Pieretti, Vicechairman, CEO
Tiziano Pieretti, Member of the Board of Directors
Carmen Pieretti, Member of the Board of Directors

See also 

Tissue core
Toilet paper

References

External links 
Official site

Manufacturing companies established in 1924
Italian companies established in 1924
Pulp and paper companies of Italy
Italian brands
Companies based in Tuscany